Islip Terrace (formerly known as Germantown) is a hamlet and census-designated place (CDP) in the Town of Islip in Suffolk County, on the South Shore of Long Island, in New York, United States. The population was 5,389 at the 2010 census.

History
In 1914, a New York City real estate agent developed houses in the woods between East Islip and Central Islip State Hospital. Many who worked in the hospital lived here. The hamlet was originally called Germantown to attract people of German origin, but was renamed Islip Terrace because of German involvement in World War I.

Geography

Demographics

As of the census of 2000, there were 5,641 people, 1,755 households, and 1,463 families residing in the CDP. The population density was 3,985.3 per square mile (1,533.8/km2). There were 1,784 housing units at an average density of 1,260.4/sq mi (485.1/km2). The racial makeup of the CDP was 95.82% White, 0.50% African American, 0.04% Native American, 1.49% Asian, 1.08% from other races, and 1.08% from two or more races. Hispanic or Latino of any race were 6.61% of the population.

There were 1,755 households, out of which 43.6% had children under the age of 18 living with them, 67.6% were married couples living together, 11.5% had a female householder with no husband present, and 16.6% were non-families. 13.2% of all households were made up of individuals, and 4.4% had someone living alone who was 65 years of age or older. The average household size was 3.21 and the average family size was 3.51.

In the CDP, the population was spread out, with 29.5% under the age of 18, 6.7% from 18 to 24, 33.6% from 25 to 44, 20.6% from 45 to 64, and 9.6% who were 65 years of age or older. The median age was 35 years. For every 100 females, there were 96.9 males. For every 100 females age 18 and over, there were 93.6 males.

The median income for a household in the CDP was $66,644, and the median income for a family was $69,389. Males had a median income of $51,036 versus $30,714 for females. The per capita income for the CDP was $23,269. About 1.7% of families and 2.4% of the population were below the poverty line, including 2.1% of those under age 18 and 3.1% of those age 65 or over.

Education
Islip Terrace, in its entirety, is served by the East Islip Union Free School District. As such, all children who reside within Islip Terrace and attend public schools go to East Islip's schools.

Additionally, East Islip High School is located within the hamlet.

East Islip High School serves the hamlets of East Islip, Great River and Islip Terrace. The public high school, which is the home of the Redmen athletic teams, serves approximately 2,000 students from grades 9–12. The school has achieved acclaim through a remarkably successful athletic program including football, bowling, baseball, softball and lacrosse. Football (most notable for the 2007 championship season), baseball, softball and bowling all regularly hold a spot in top Long Island ranks, and the boys lacrosse program has achieved national recognition.

Parks and recreation
Beaver Dam Park is located within Islip Terrace.

Transportation

Roads
Major roads within the hamlet of Islip Terrace are:
 NY Route 27, also known as Sunrise Highway (Exit 46N)
 Southern State Parkway/Heckscher State Parkway (Exit 43A,43W,43E)
 Suffolk County Route 17, also known as Carleton Avenue, runs parallel to NY Route 111 (Islip Avenue) from its southern terminus at NY 27A in Islip to its northern terminus at NY 111 near the Long Island Expressway in Hauppauge.

Airport

Train
No railroad lines run through Islip Terrace. The closest stations to the hamlet are the 1897-established Great River Station along the Long Island Rail Road Montauk Branch, originally built by the South Side Railroad of Long Island until 1876. and the nearby 1868-built Islip Station which is also on the Montauk Branch of the railroad.

Buses
There are many bus stops in Islip Terrace, mostly along branches of the 3C. Buses are operated and maintained by the local Suffolk Transportation Service, Inc.

References

Islip (town), New York
Census-designated places in New York (state)
Census-designated places in Suffolk County, New York